Henri-Benjamin Rainville (April 5, 1852 – August 10, 1937) was a Canadian lawyer, politician and Speaker of the Legislative Assembly of the Province of Quebec.

Born in Sainte-Marie-de-Monnoir, Quebec, the son of Felix Rainville, a farmer of French descent from Touques (Calvados), and Marie Daignault, Rainville obtained his elementary and classical education at the colleges of St. Hyacinthe and Ste. Angele de Monnoir, afterwards entering the law faculty of McGill University, and graduating with the degree of B.C.L. in 1873. He was called to the Quebec Bar on January 14, 1874 and practiced law with the law firm of Rainville, Archambault Gervais and Rainville. He was a member of the Montreal City Council from 1882 until 1900, sitting for Centre Ward.

He was first elected to the Legislative Assembly of Quebec for Montréal division no. 3 in the 1890 election. A Liberal, he was defeated in 1892, but was elected in 1897 and 1900. From 1901 to 1905, he was the Speaker of the Legislative Assembly. He was defeated in 1904 and 1908. He was the brother of Judge Henri-Félix Rainville.

References

 
 

1852 births
1937 deaths
French Quebecers
Montreal city councillors
Presidents of the National Assembly of Quebec
Lawyers in Quebec
Quebec Liberal Party MNAs
McGill University Faculty of Law alumni